The Wildwood Recreation Site is a natural recreation area surrounded by the Mount Hood National Forest in northern Oregon, United States.  It encompasses  of old growth forest and five miles (8 km) of interpretive trail along the Salmon River. It features Cascade Streamwatch, an underwater viewport into a mountain stream bed and live fish habitat.  There is a wetland boardwalk trail, and trail access to the nearby  Salmon-Huckleberry Wilderness, and the Sandy River.

Wildwood educational programs offer scientists and researchers to help students gather and analyze environmental data related to the Salmon environment such as the river's chemical and physical properties, and the many resident invertebrates.

A variety of streams and wetlands provide a diverse environment. Sixes Creek and a quarter mile (400 m) side channel of the Salmon River (restored in 1998), provide habitat for several anadromous fish:  steelhead, Cutthroat trout and Chinook salmon. The wetlands and Huckleberry Mountain are the source of Sixes Creek, both of which provide habitat for juvenile Coho salmon, waterbirds, amphibians, and migratory birds. Other frequently seen wildlife include beavers, blacktail deer, raccoons, rabbits, and snakes. The entire 33.9 mile (55 km) length of the Salmon River is protected as a National Wild and Scenic River. This area was near the end of the Barlow Road, the end of the Oregon Trail.

The site is administered by the Bureau of Land Management and charges an admission fee. Facilities include outdoor study areas, picnic areas, group shelters for up to 200 people, softball diamonds, volleyball pits, basketball courts, horseshoe pits, playground with jungle gym, swings and slides.

References

External links 
 Wildwood Recreation Site. Recreation.gov.
 Mount Hood area hiking trails.
 Huckleberry Mountain trail. SummitPost.org.

Cascade Range
Parks in Clackamas County, Oregon
Old-growth forests
Hiking trails in Oregon
Bureau of Land Management areas in Oregon